The Yakima Valley Braves, was the final name of a minor league baseball club, located in Yakima, Washington, playing from 1965 to 1966 as members of the Northwest League. Yakima hosted professional baseball beginning in 1937 through 1965 with a brief hiatus between 1942 and 1945 due to World War II. Playing under various names, Yakima was a member of the Western International League.

History
The Pippins were the club to represent Yakima, starting in 1937. The franchise used the Pippins name through 1941 when the club suspended operations. Likewise, the Western International League suspended play after the 1942 season. The Pippins name was resurrected in by the Yakima Valley Pippins of the collegiate wood bat West Coast League.

The League resumed play in 1946 with Yakima returning to the field under a new name, the Stars. The Stars were affiliated with the Pittsburgh Pirates in 1946. In 1948 the club changed names again to the Yakima Packers. The Packers finished the season in last place.

In 1949 the club adopted a new moniker, the Yakima Bears. In their first season the Bears advanced to the post-season. The Bears defeated the Spokane Indians in the semi-final series, but were swept by the Vancouver Capilanos in the championship. The following season the Bears posted a record on 92–58 to claim the league championship. In 1956 won their second league title, finishing the year at 86–45.

Professional baseball returned to Yakima in 1990. The Northwest League franchise revived Yakima Bears playing as an affiliate of the Los Angeles Dodgers  and Arizona Diamondbacks until 2012.

Season-by-season record

Notable alumni

 Rico Carty (1962) MLB All-Star; 1970 NL Batting Title
 Mike Lum (1965)
 Lee Maye (1955)
 Dennis Menke (1961) 2 x MLB All-Star
 Felix Millan (1965) 3 x MLB All-Star
 Carl Morton (1965) 1970 NL Rookie of the Year
 Bill Robinson

Baseball teams established in 1937
Baseball teams disestablished in 1966
Defunct Northwest League teams
Professional baseball teams in Washington (state)
1937 establishments in Washington (state)
1966 disestablishments in Washington (state)
Pittsburgh Pirates minor league affiliates
Milwaukee Braves minor league affiliates
Atlanta Braves minor league affiliates